Since 1995, Befimmo has been pursuing a policy of investing in buildings in locations and letting them to tenants. Over time, Befimmo has specialised in particular in investing in office buildings mainly located in city centres, notably in Brussels. In 2021, Befimmo's portfolio consisted of around 60 offices and mixed-use buildings and 8 coworking spaces, value at about €2.8 billion. Since 3 January 2023, Befimmo SA has left the stock market.

History 

On 30 August 1995, "Woluwe Garden D SA" was founded, a subsidiary of the Bernheim-Comofi group (now AG Real Estate), with the mission of buying and letting buildings. The company was originally devoted mainly to the management of a building named "Woluwe Garden D", at boulevard de la Woluwe No 24, Zaventem (St Stevens Woluwe).

The Bernheim-Comofi group then decided to expand its subsidiary's property portfolio, which was then renamed Befimmo and converted into a Société en Commandite par Actions. On 29 November 1995, Befimmo was approved by the Banking, Finance and Insurance Commission: the first Belgian fixed-capital real-estate investment trust (Sicafi) was introduced on the stock market.

In 2012, Befimmo became a Limited Liability Company and by the end of 2014, the Company became a B-REIT.

Early 2023, Befimmo left the stock market and became a Specialised real estate investment fund (FIIS/GVBF).

Companies based in Brussels
Companies listed on Euronext Brussels